Mimi Hristova (born 19 July 1993) is a Bulgarian freestyle wrestler. She competed in the women's freestyle 58 kg event at the 2016 Summer Olympics, in which she was eliminated in the round of 32 by Pürevdorjiin Orkhon.

In 2020, she won one of the bronze medals in the women's 65 kg event at the 2020 Individual Wrestling World Cup held in Belgrade, Serbia. In 2021, she won the silver medal in the 68 kg event at the Matteo Pellicone Ranking Series 2021 held in Rome, Italy. In May 2021, she qualified at the World Olympic Qualification Tournament to represent Bulgaria at the 2020 Summer Olympics in Tokyo, Japan. She competed in the women's 68 kg event.

She lost her bronze medal match in the women's 65kg event at the 2022 World Wrestling Championships held in Belgrade, Serbia.

Achievements

References

External links
 

1993 births
Living people
Bulgarian female sport wrestlers
Olympic wrestlers of Bulgaria
Wrestlers at the 2016 Summer Olympics
Wrestlers at the 2015 European Games
Wrestlers at the 2019 European Games
European Games medalists in wrestling
European Games silver medalists for Bulgaria
European Wrestling Championships medalists
Wrestlers at the 2020 Summer Olympics
European Wrestling Champions
People from Vratsa
21st-century Bulgarian women